Matthieu Bochart (c. 19 March 1619 — 1662) was a French Protestant minister at Alençon from 1635-1662.

Career 
Bochart published  and  Judicial proceedings were commenced against him for having used the forbidden title of pastors for Protestant ministers. He published Dialogue sur les difficultés que les Missionnaires font aux Protestant de France. This dialogue on the tolerance of Lutheran errors inspired the Elector Palatine to try and unite the two reformed churches in Germany, the Lutheran and the Calvinist churches. Palatine advocated their union in the assembly of Protestant princes at Frankfurt. Upon hearing this, Matthieu Bochart published his Dialectician, a conciliatory treatise, in 1662, which he dedicated to Palatine. It contains the plan of this projected union. Matthieu's cousin is the more well-known Samuel Bochart.

Works
 
 
 

 

 
 Diallacticon, seu tractatus de conciliandis in religionis negotio Protestantium animis (1662)

References

1662 deaths
French Calvinist and Reformed theologians
17th-century Calvinist and Reformed theologians
17th-century French theologians
Year of birth uncertain